Cyberpunx is a comic book series produced by Image Comics. It is about a group of cyborg computer hacker warriors that enter into a virtual reality in order to stop an alien invasion by the Cyberlords. As a homage to Cyberpunk author William Gibson, the leading computer scientist in the story is named Karl Gibson.

The first issue came out in March 1996. The creator of the series is Rob Liefeld; the script is by Robert Loren Fleming and the artwork is by Ching Lau.

Image Comics titles